Anthony Benin is a Ghanaian judge and is a former justice of the Supreme Court of Ghana. He was one of two judges sworn into office by the President of Ghana, John Dramani Mahama in the presence of the Chief Justice of Ghana, Georgina Theodora Wood in November 2012.

He has presided in cases of the ECOWAS court.

Early life and education
Benin was born on 4 January 1950 at Kumasi. He had his secondary education at Sekondi College, completing his studies in 1970. He continued at the University of Ghana, graduating with his bachelors' degree in 1973. He proceeded to the Ghana School of Law where he completed his studies in 1975. He was called to the bar in that same year.

Career
In 1976, Benin was appointed assistate state attorney. Three years later, he joined the bench as a grade two District Magistrate. He became an Appeal Court Judge in 1994 and 2012 he was appointed justice of the Supreme Court of Ghana. While serving on the Appeal Court bench, he was appointed to the West African Regional Court as a pioneer judge in 2001. He became Vice President of the Court from 2007 to 2009. He served on the ECOWAS Community Court until 2011. He retired from the Supreme Court of Ghana in January 2020.

See also
List of judges of the Supreme Court of Ghana
Supreme Court of Ghana
Judiciary of Ghana

References

External links
GhanalLive TV
GhanaReview International

1950 births
Living people
Justices of the Supreme Court of Ghana
Sekondi College alumni
University of Ghana alumni